Batrachopus may refer to:
 Batrachopus (reptile), an ichnogenus of crocodylomorph tracks
 Batrachopus, a genus of grasshoppers in the family Romaleidae, synonym of Antandrus
 Batrachopus, a genus of fishes in the family Antennariidae, synonym of Histrio